Theodore Tilton (October 2, 1835 – May 29, 1907) was an American newspaper editor, poet and abolitionist. He was born in New York City to Silas Tilton and Eusebia Tilton (same surname). On his twentieth birthday, October 2, 1855, he married Elizabeth Richards. Tilton's newspaper work was fully supportive of abolitionism and the Northern cause in the American Civil War.

Theodore Tilton was present at The Southern Loyalist Convention held in Philadelphia in September 1866. Frederick Douglass writes of him in his autobiography:

There was one man present who was broad enough to take in the whole situation, and brave enough to meet the duty of the hour; one who was neither afraid nor ashamed to own me as a man and a brother; one man of the purest Caucasian type, a poet and a scholar, brilliant as a writer, eloquent as a speaker, and holding a high and influential position—the editor of a weekly journal having the largest circulation of any weekly paper in the city or State of New York—and that man was Mr. Theodore Tilton. He came to me in my isolation, seized me by the hand in a most brotherly way, and proposed to walk with me in the procession.

From 1860 to 1871, Tilton was the assistant of Henry Ward Beecher.  He gave the 1869 commencement speech for the Irving Literary Society.

In 1874 Tilton filed a complaint against Beecher for "criminal conversation" (adultery) with Elizabeth Richards Tilton and sued for a $100,000 judgment.

The Beecher-Tilton trial ended in a deadlocked jury. Afterwards, Tilton moved to Paris, where he lived for the rest of his life. In the 1880s, Tilton frequently played chess with fellow American exile (but ex-Confederate) Judah Benjamin, until the latter died in 1884.

As a poet, Tilton is famous for his masterpiece 'Even This Shall Pass Away', a poem that talks about how everything in life is limited and will end.

Work referenced 
Robert Plant put Tilton's 1858 poem "The King's Ring: Even This Shall Pass Away" to music, a recording of which is on Band of Joy.

Principal works 
 Victoria C. Woodhull. A Biographical Sketch. 1871
 Tempest-Tossed A Romance. 1874. 
 The Complete Poetical Works of Theodore Tilton in One Volume With a Preface on Ballad-Making and an Appendix on Old Norse Myths & Fables. 1897.

References 
 Fox, Richard Wightman. Trials of Intimacy Love and Loss in the Beecher-Tilton Scandal. Chicago, IL: University of Chicago Press, 1999. 
 Applegate, Debby. The Most Famous Man in America: The Biography of Henry Ward Beecher. New York: Doubleday, 2006.
 Tilton's literary work Accessed January 25, 2008

Specific

External links

 Mr. Lincoln and New York: Theodore Tilton 

1835 births
1907 deaths
American newspaper editors
Religious scandals
American abolitionists
19th-century American poets
American male poets
19th-century male writers
American male non-fiction writers